Claudio Fabián "Chiqui" Tapia (born 22 September 1967) is an Argentine football executive and current President of the Argentine Football Association (Spanish: Asociación del Fútbol Argentino) and Liga Profesional de Fútbol (an entity that rules and organises the Primera División championships). At club level, Tapia was president of Barracas Central from 2001 to 2020.

Tapia is also vice-president of "CEAMSE" (Spanish: Coordinación Ecológica Área Metropolitana Sociedad del Estado), a public company that operates on the handling and processing of municipal solid waste in Greater Buenos Aires.

Early life
Tapia was born on 22 September 1967 in Concepción, San Juan Province, to Washington Tapia and Leonor Olivera. As a child, he moved to the San Telmo neighborhood of Buenos Aires. He played football, originally as a sweeper, then as a striker for Barracas Central.

Professional career
Tapia played at Independiente's youth divisions and then in Barracas Central, where he was part of the senior squad. He then moved to Sportivo Dock Sud. After his career as footballer ended prematurely, Tapia started working at the Argentine Lorry Drivers' Union.

In 2000, a group of members of Barracas Central invited him to return to the club. Tapia became president of the club in 2001. Under his leadership, Barracas Central won the 2009–10  Primera C championship, and the 2018–19  Primera B Metropolitana championship, promoting to Primera Nacional, the second level of Argentine football. His tenure on Barracas Central ended in March 2020, after 18 years. His son Matías replaced him as president of the club.

Tapia was voted President of the AFA on 29 March 2017, with a mandate until 2021. The vote was passed with 40 votes in favour and 3 abstentions. He replaced Luis Segura, who was forced to resign when fraud charges were brought against him in June 2016.

Personal life
Tapia was married to Paola Moyano, daughter of former Secretary General of the CGT, Hugo Moyano. His sons, Iván and Matías, are also footballers.

References

External links

 

1967 births
Living people
Tapia family
Sportspeople from San Juan Province, Argentina
Association football forwards
Barracas Central players
Presidents of the Argentine Football Association
Argentine footballers